Natasha Low Yi Ling (born 11 October 1993), better known by her stage name, Tasha Low, is a Singaporean singer and actress. She was the leader of the South Korean girl group, Skarf from 2012 to 2014. She is currently based in Singapore as an artiste and made her feature film debut in The Diam Diam Era (2020).

Early life
Born into a family of ballroom dancers, Low's great-grandfather was Low Poh San, who introduced ballroom dancing to Singapore and would later become Singapore Professional Ballroom Champion in 1946 and from 1950 to 1953. Low's grandfather, Sunny Low, was also an accomplished dancer and was a household name in Singapore in the 70's and 80's. Her parents, Alvyn Low and Lucy Wang, were also accomplished ballroom dancers. They divorced in 2007. Low's brother was also trained in Thailand to be a professional ballroom dancer.

After graduating with a Singapore-Cambridge GCE Ordinary Level at Fuhua Secondary School, Low accompanied her friend to participate in the Singapore leg of the JYP and Alpha Asean Region Audition held in 2010 by Alpha Entertainment. Being one of the four Singaporeans selected, Low moved to South Korea the following year.

Low is fluent in English, Mandarin Chinese, and Korean.

Career

2012–2017: Debut with Skarf and solo activities in Korea

After undergoing two years of intensive training in South Korea, Low debuted with the Singaporean-South Korean girl group Skarf, in which she served as the leader, lead dancer, rapper and vocalist. She and another member, Ferlyn, were the two Singaporean members in Skarf until Wong left the group in 2014. The group debuted with their first mini album, Oh! Dance and performed the song on KBS's Music Bank on 17 August 2012. On 14 August 2012, Skarf held their debut showcase in Seoul.

In 2012, Low was picked as an endorsement model for a smartphone line, Pantech Vega R3. In 2013, she was selected as a host for Arirang's music program, Pops in Seoul. In the same year, Low also appeared on MBC's Gangnam Feel Dance. In 2014, she joined MBC's Dancing 9 alongside Glam's Zinni but was disqualified for personal reasons. In 2015, Low appeared as the female lead in TimeZ's and Roy Kim's MV for "Awaken" and "The Great Dipper", respectively.

It was announced in 2015 that Low will be joining a new group following the disbandment of Skarf in 2014, with the group being sold to CJ E&M. In 2016, Low and other trainees under CJ E&M made an appearance on Chinese girl group survival reality programme Lady Bees.

In 2017, Low joined the girl group survival show Idol School to compete with 40 other contestants for an opportunity to debut in a 9-member girl group. Although she was recognised for her dance and leadership abilities, she was eliminated from the potential debut group when she ranked 23rd in Episode 10.

On 31 December 2017, her Instagram post stated that she will be starting her solo career, where she will be promoting future activities as Yu I Yeong.

2018–present: Return to Singapore
In January 2018, Tasha stopped all her activities in Korea and returned to Singapore.

Tasha was cast and played her first lead role in the 2019 web series, Cheerific, which follows the story of a star rugby player who finds his calling as a cheerleader after getting kicked off the rugby team. She is also part of the television adaption of Goh Boon Teck's 1994 play, Titoudao, which premiered on 18 February 2020 on Mediacorp Channel 5. Titoudao was later dubbed in Chinese and broadcast on Mediacorp Channel 8 from 18 May 2020.

Tasha made her film debut in 2020's The Diam Diam Era, and its 2021 sequel The Diam Diam Era Two. She further played major roles in original Chinese drama series broadcast on Mediacorp Channel 8, such as Mind Jumper and Live Your Dreams in 2021.

Discography

Filmography

Film

Television series

Television shows

Awards and nominations

References

External links

 Official site 

1993 births
Living people
Chinese K-pop singers
Korean-language singers of Singapore
Singaporean expatriates in South Korea
21st-century Singaporean women singers
Singaporean people of Chinese descent
Singaporean television actresses